Christian Helmig (born ) is a Luxembourgish cyclo-cross cyclist. He competed in the men's elite event at the 2016 UCI Cyclo-cross World Championships.

Major results

Cyclo-cross

2011–2012
 2nd National Cyclo-cross Championships
2012–2013
 1st  National Cyclo-cross Championships
 1st Grand Prix GEBA
2013–2014
 1st  National Cyclo-cross Championships
 1st Grand Prix GEBA
2014–2015
 1st  National Cyclo-cross Championships
2015–2016
 1st  National Cyclo-cross Championships

Road

2010
 4th Overall Vuelta Independencia Nacional
2011
 4th National Road Race Championships
2012
 3rd National Time Trial Championships
2013
 3rd Time trial, Games of the Small States of Europe

Mountain Bike

2013
 1st Cross-country, Games of the Small States of Europe
 1st  National Cross-country Championships
2014
 1st  National Cross-country Championships
 1st  National Cross-country Marathon Championships
2015
 1st  National Cross-country Championships
 1st  National Cross-country Marathon Championships
2016
 1st  National Cross-country Eliminator Championships
 1st  National Enduro Championships

References

External links
 

1981 births
Living people
Cyclo-cross cyclists
Luxembourgian male cyclists
Place of birth missing (living people)
Cyclists at the 2015 European Games
European Games competitors for Luxembourg